Clyzomedus fastidiosus is a species of beetle in the family Cerambycidae. It was described by Jean Baptiste Boisduval in 1835, originally under the genus Acanthocinus. It is known from Papua New Guinea, Indonesia, and the Philippines.

Subspecies
 Clyzomedus fastidiosus fastidiosus (Boisduval, 1835)
 Clyzomedus fastidiosus philippinensis Breuning, 1965
 Clyzomedus fastidiosus toekanensis Breuning, 1965

References

Mesosini
Beetles described in 1835